Erwan Pain (born 14 February 1986) is a French former professional ice hockey winger.

Pain played in the Ligue Magnus for Chamonix HC, Ducs de Dijon, Drakkars de Caen and Brest Albatros Hockey. He also participated at the 2010 IIHF World Championship as a member of the France national team.

References

External links

1986 births
Living people
Brest Albatros Hockey players
Chamonix HC players
Drakkars de Caen players
Ducs de Dijon players
French ice hockey forwards
French people of Guadeloupean descent
Guadeloupean sportspeople
People from Pointe-à-Pitre